Per Hans Ernst Jordbakke (14 March 1932 – 20 November 1965) was a Norwegian sailor. He was born in Bærum. He competed at the 1960 Summer Olympics in Rome, where placed 13th in the Finn class. He also competed at the 1964 Summer Olympics, where he placed 15th in the Finn class.

References

External links

1932 births
1965 deaths
Sportspeople from Bærum
Norwegian male sailors (sport)
Olympic sailors of Norway
Sailors at the 1960 Summer Olympics – Finn
Sailors at the 1964 Summer Olympics – Finn